Lateef may refer to:

People

Given name
 Lateef Adegbite, Nigerian regional Attorney General Nigeria
 Lateef Crowder Dos Santos, Brazilian-born American actor
 Lateef Elford-Alliyu, English football player
 Lateef Jakande, Nigerian journalist and politician
 Lateef Kayode, Nigerian boxer
 Lateef the Truthspeaker, American hip hop artist

Surname
 Yusef Lateef, American jazz musician
 Fatimah Lateef, Singaporean politician
 Shahid Lateef, retired Pakistan Air Force three-star
 Ali Lateef, Iraqi footballer

Other uses
 Lateef (film)

See also 
 Latif (disambiguation)